Gone Is Gone is an American rock supergroup formed in 2016. The band consists of Troy Sanders, singer and bassist of Mastodon, Troy Van Leeuwen, one of the guitarists of Queens of the Stone Age, Tony Hajjar, drummer of At the Drive-In, and Mike Zarin, a multi-instrumentalist and founder of Sencit Music who appeared with Van Leeuwen on Sweethead's Descent to the Surface. The band released an EP and two studio albums.

Band members 
Troy Sanders – lead vocals, bass guitar
Troy Van Leeuwen – guitar
Tony Hajjar – drums
Mike Zarin – guitar, keyboards, backing vocals

Gone Is Gone (EP) 
Gone Is Gone's eponymous EP was released on Rise Records on July 8, 2016.

Track listing

Echolocation 
Gone Is Gone's first full-length album released through Rise Records on January 6, 2017.

Track listing

If Everything Happens for a Reason... Then Nothing Really Matters at All 
Their second album If Everything Happens for a Reason... Then Nothing Really Matters at All was released on December 4, 2020.

Track listing

References

Hard rock musical groups from California
Musical groups established in 2016
Rock music supergroups
2016 establishments in California